Eric Staines Oliver (13 April 1911 – 1 March 1980) was an English motorcycle racer best remembered as four-time Sidecar World Champion administered by the FIM, riding a Norton. His passenger in 1949 was Denis Jenkinson. He is also remembered for his innovation, being the first sidecar competitor to use a dustbin fairing, rear suspension and the first to adopt a semi-kneeling riding position.

He was also an accomplished solo racer and continued to ride a 350 Grand Prix bike while racing a sidecar.

Oliver made a surprising appearance in the 1958 Isle of Man Sidecar TT race on a standard Norton Dominator 88 with a Watsonian "Monaco" road sidecar with Mrs Pat Wise in the sidecar, finishing tenth ahead of many specialised race machines. Oliver's last TT appearance was in the 1960 with passenger Stan Dibben but they had a bad crash in practice with Oliver breaking his back in two places and Dibben was nearly decapitated. Both men decided to retire from racing after this.

Oliver later switched to car racing with a Lotus Elan and on 1 January 1955 opened a motorcycle dealership in Staines, later selling Reliant cars.

World Championship results 

(key) (Races in bold indicate pole position; races in italics indicate fastest lap. An empty black cell indicates that the class did not compete at that particular championship round.)

References

External links
  TT Database

Isle of Man TT riders
English motorcycle racers
People from Crowborough
1911 births
1980 deaths
Sidecar racers